The chestnut-throated flycatcher (Myiagra castaneigularis) is a species of bird in the monarch-flycatcher family Monarchidae.  The species is endemic to Fiji.

Taxonomy and systematics 
In 2016, the chestnut-throated flycatcher was recognized as a new species after being split from the azure-crested flycatcher.

Subspecies 
Two subspecies are recognized:
 M. c. castaneigularis - Layard, 1876: Found on Vanua Levu (northern Fiji)
 M. c. whitneyi - Mayr, 1933: Found on Viti Levu (western Fiji)

References 

Myiagra
Endemic birds of Fiji
Birds described in 1876